The Swing Kings: A Tribute to Benny Goodman is a jazz tribute album led by Bucky Pizzarelli and Ray Kennedy, dedicated to Benny Goodman and released by Victoria Records in 2005.

Track listing

 Back Home Again in Indiana
 Corner Pocket 
 Crying for the Carolines
 'Deed I Do  
 I Don't Know Why I Love You Like I Do   
 I Guess I'll Have To Change My Plan  
 Oh, Lady Be Good!
 More Than You Know
 Seven On Charlie   
 Some of These Days
 Tangerine   
 They Can't Take That Away From Me

Personnel
Bucky Pizzarelli - guitar 
Ray Kennedy - piano 
Ken Peplowski - clarinet 
Martin Pizzarelli - double bass 
Chuck Redd - vibraphone 
Tony Tedesco - drums

References

2003 albums
Benny Goodman tribute albums
Bucky Pizzarelli albums